Amuro may refer to:

Fictional characters
Amuro Ray, a space pilot in Mobile Suit Gundam
Tōru Amuro, a detective in Detective Conan

Other uses
Namie Amuro (born 1977), Japanese entertainer

Japanese-language surnames